Paintbox may refer to:

 Paintbox (software), a graphics utility for the ZX Spectrum, released in 1983
 Quantel Paintbox, a computer graphics workstation for television video and graphics, released in 1981
 "Paint Box" (song), by Pink Floyd, 1967
 PaintBox, a program operated by the Boston Art Commission, Massachusetts, US